Territory located in Ghana. Traditional authority of the Nanumba people.

See also
Ghana
Gold Coast
Lists of office-holders

Rulers
Lists of African monarchs
Ghana politics-related lists